The Gurabo River is a river and tributary of the Loíza River in Puerto Rico. In 2018, the U.S. Army Corps of Engineers announced work would be done on the river, which runs through several municipalities including Gurabo, Juncos, and Las Piedras.

In 2018, homes in Juncos were on the verge of collapse as a result of erosion and landslides caused by a change in the rivers trajectory.

Gallery

See also
List of rivers of Puerto Rico

References

External links
 USGS Hydrologic Unit Map – Caribbean Region (1974)
 Rios de Puerto Rico

Rivers of Puerto Rico